American Cast Iron Pipe Company is a manufacturer of ductile iron pipe, spiral-welded steel pipe, fire hydrants, and valves for the waterworks industry, and electric-resistance-welded steel pipe for the oil and natural gas industry. Headquartered in Birmingham, Alabama, American's diversified product line also includes static castings and high performance fire pumps.

History

Many believe that American was founded by John Joseph Eagan; however, it was, in fact, Charlotte Blair, a businesswoman who conceived of the idea for the pipe company. She and her brother James recruited the initial investors, including Mr. Eagan, who was the company's first president and later sole proprietor. Mr. Eagan's vision was a company built on the Golden Rule—treat others the way you want to be treated—that would be of service to God and humankind. This philosophy still guides the business today.

In 1924, Mr. Eagan died of complications from TB. Upon his death, having previously acquired all of the stock of the company, he willed ownership of the company in a trust to its employees.

In the 1920s, American developed a proprietary Mono-Cast centrifugal casting method and increased pipe diameters to a record 24 inches (610 mm). The company also introduced cement-lined pipe, which became the industry standard.

The company’s first official safety program served as an industry model. A program of excellent employee benefits became synonymous with the American name.

The financial crash of 1929 had little effect on the company at first, but soon, business started to decline resulting in a loss of jobs. But by the mid-1930s, government spending on municipal water supplies, fire protection and sanitation brought a resurgence in business and helped restore jobs.

In 1939, business was further boosted by federal defense spending to support the impending war. When the country entered World War II, American was asked to apply its centrifugal casting experience to another metal – steel. The manufacturing of steel parts for ships, planes and tanks led to the creation of a new Special Products Division for steel products, the first diversification in American’s history.

The 1940s were marked by the industrial invention of a stronger and more durable iron called ductile iron. American took a lead role in use of this new iron to make large-diameter pipe that was thinner yet stronger.

The country’s growing population and rapidly expanding infrastructure in the 1950s and 1960s meant more demand for pipe for use in water, energy, transportation and sanitation systems.

In 1955, American shipped its first large order of ductile iron pipe. A new melting system in 1972, including the largest cupola of its kind in the world, would supply the new iron for this pipe, and American would move from a Sand Spun casting process to a generation of deLavaud metal molds, still used today.
Throughout the 1960s, American would continue to diversify, adding its valves and hydrants product line and gaskets.

American’s innovation, diversification and capital investments saw it through economically challenging times in the early 1980s. It expanded its steel pipe business and acquired Waterous Company of St. Paul, Minnesota, to add fire pumps to its product line and increase market share in valves and hydrants.
Throughout the 1990s the company embraced the digital age, applying computing and Internet technologies across the board. It also opened a scrap recycling facility on site.

As the new millennium dawned, American was poised for further growth, opening American SpiralWeld Pipe Company in Columbia, South Carolina, and diversifying its product line to include spiral-welded steel pipe in diameters up to 144 inches (3,700 mm).

Also in 2000, American engineered a single electrode DC furnace, the only one of its kind in the world.

The turn of the century would bring a host of innovations for American's water works divisions, including zinc-coated ductile iron pipe, the AFC Mapper for utility asset management, gate valves up to 60 inches in diameter and American's Earthquake Joint System.

Its Steel Pipe Division would also see major developments. In 2015, American Steel Pipe completed a $70-million expansion, including a new 150,000-square-foot processing facility and upgrades to its two mills.

AMERICAN SpiralWeld Pipe Company is expanding its spiral-welded steel pipe operations to Paris, Texas. The company will invest $70-$90 million in the construction of a new facility, which will house the latest in pipe manufacturing technology. The plant is expected to be operational by the first quarter of 2021.

Divisions

American Steel Pipe
American Steel Pipe, based in Birmingham, Alabama, produces electric-resistance-welded steel pipe. Applications include high pressure oil and gas transmission lines, distribution main lines, offshore gathering systems, steel pipe pilings, abrasive-resistance pipe, HIC resistant pipe for sour service, dredge pipe, and product pipelines.

American Ductile Iron Pipe
American Ductile Iron Pipe, based in Birmingham, Alabama, manufactures ductile iron pipe in standard 20-foot lengths ranging from 4-64 inches in diameter. The company’s product line also features joints of various types designed for ease of installation and dependability in a variety of conditions. American also furnishes standard and special linings and coatings.

American Flow Control
In March 1991, American Cast Iron Pipe Company merged its two valve- and hydrant-producing subsidiaries—American-Darling Valve and Waterous—into one division, American Flow Control. This merger yielded a division active in the design and production of waterworks and fire protection products. Production facilities are located in Beaumont, Texas, and South St. Paul, Minnesota.

American Spiral-Weld Pipe
American SpiralWeld Pipe Company, LLC was established as a division of American in 1999. American SpiralWeld, located on a  site in Columbia, South Carolina, manufactures spiral-welded steel pipe for use in water, wastewater, hydropower, and industrial applications. In 2013, American announced a new spiral-welded pipe production facility in Flint, Michigan. The facility began operations in 2015. In 2021 SpiralWeld opened a new 286,000 square foot production facility on a 147 acre site in Paris Texas.

American Castings
American Castings, LLC is located in Pryor, Oklahoma. The plant produces grey and ductile iron castings for automotive, heavy-equipment, industrial machinery and other product manufacturers.

See also
Birmingham District

References

External links
American Cast Iron Pipe Company at the Stuart A. Rose Manuscript, Archives, and Rare Book Library

Companies based in Birmingham, Alabama
Historic American Engineering Record in Alabama
Privately held companies based in Alabama